Historia de la Musica Rock  is the third studio album by the American noise rock band Pussy Galore, released in 1990 by Caroline Records in America and Rough Trade Records in England. It was their final studio album.

The album was recorded in two days. The title and cover spoof a series of compilations published in the early 1980s by Orbis records in Spain.

Critical reception

The Washington Post wrote: "Pussy Galore wants to play bad and be great. But, as Historia proves yet again, only the first part of that formula can be learned."

Track listing

Personnel
Adapted from the Historia de la Musica Rock liner notes.

Pussy Galore
 Bob Bert – drums, percussion
 Neil Hagerty – electric guitar, vocals
 Jon Spencer – lead vocals, electric guitar

Production and additional personnel
 Peter Arsenault – recording, mixing
 Michael Lavine – photography
 Pussy Galore – production, mixing

Release history

References

External links 
 

Pussy Galore (band) albums
1990 albums
Caroline Records albums
Rough Trade Records albums
Albums produced by Steve Albini